Nellie Vladimirovna Kim (born 29 July 1957) is a retired Soviet and Belarusian gymnast of Sakhalin Korean and Tatar descent who won three gold medals and a silver medal at the 1976 Summer Olympics in Montreal, and two gold medals at the 1980 Summer Olympics. She was the second woman in Olympic history to earn a perfect 10 score and the first woman to score it on the vault and on the floor exercise, rivaling Nadia Comăneci, Ludmilla Tourischeva, and other strong competitors of the 1970s. 

Kim worked for a long time as a coach, training several national teams, and judged many major international competitions. As President of the Women's Artistic Gymnastics Technical Committee, she coordinates the introduction of new rules in women's gymnastics, as provided by the new Code of Points, developed by the FIG in 2004–2005 and in effect since 2006. Her gymnastic appearances are remembered for "her strong feminine, temperamental and charismatic appeal".

Early life
Nellie Kim was born in Shurab, Tajik SSR, Soviet Union. She is the daughter of a Sakhalin Korean father, Vladimir Kim, and a Tatar mother, Alfiya Safina. Later the family moved to Kazakh SSR, where her father worked in the Chimkent slate factory. At age 9, she entered Chimkent City Children and Youth Sports School 3 of the Spartak Sports Society. Two other children in the family, her younger brother Alexander and her sister Irina, also entered a gymnastics school and trained for some time. Alexander was harassed by his classmates in the secondary school for his small stature and retired from gymnastics in favor of boxing. Irina, whom Nellie considered more talented than she, retired because of the demands of the frequent training sessions.

Kim's trainers were Vladimir Baidin and his wife, Galina Barkova. Initially, she did not have the required flexibility of many of her fellow gymnasts, but was soon able to compensate with superior technique and the difficulty of her exercises. Kim excelled and quickly became one of the best in Soviet gymnastics.

One of Kim's earliest successes was her victory in the republican Spartak's competition, held in Chimkent in 1969. Nevertheless, a year later she was said to "have no future" by celebrated gymnast Larisa Latynina. After that verdict, Kim was close to leaving gymnastics but persevered with support from Baidin. At the 1971 Junior USSR Championships, her first national competition, she placed fifth in the all-around. Success in the national junior circuit, as well as senior national and international debuts, followed two years later. Kim won the all-around title and two more gold medals at the All-Union Youth Sports Games, placed eighth in the all-around and first on the uneven bars at the USSR Cup; she also won the prestigious Chunichi Cup in Japan. After a second-place finish at the USSR Cup in August 1974, Kim was added to the team roster for the World Championships, held in October, where she earned the gold medal in the team competition. Afterwards, and until 1980, she successfully competed in numerous top-level international events.

Kim's nickname among USSR teammates and team coaches was "Kimanellie," which she earned, when a trainer Vladislav Rastorotsky called her very quickly: "Kim, Nellie, to the phone!"

Olympics and World Championships
Nellie Kim became one of the main medal prospects for the upcoming Olympics and actual leader of the Soviet team after the 1975 Canadian Pre-Olympics Test competition. At the Test she placed second in the all-around to Nadia Comăneci, but won three golds in the event finals (vault, balance beam, floor exercise), while Comăneci won the remaining one on bars. Larisa Latynina, who had already changed her opinion about Kim earlier, described her gymnastics style as sparkling and cheerful. She also cited a comment by Canadian newspapers about Kim's performance: "There are moments, when a natural smile is more worth, than triumph". However, although Kim also won the 1976 USSR Cup, beating famous compatriots such as Olga Korbut and Ludmilla Tourischeva, they were still considered leaders by the media. Even the Coach Council of the Soviet team failed to define her as the leader. That was to prove a mistake, as later recognized by Soviet experts.

At the 1976 Summer Olympics, the rivalry between Nellie Kim and Nadia Comăneci became the focal point of the women's gymnastics competition. Kim's teammates Ludmilla Tourischeva and Olga Korbut, the Olympic champions of Munich, were overcome by the two rising stars in the battle for the gold. Kim won three gold medals, one in the team competition and two in the event finals: on the vault and floor exercise. Music for her floor routine, choreographed by Valentina Kosolapova, was a fiery Samba, and one of the elements was the double back salto, performed for the first time in Olympic women's events. Kim also won a silver medal in the all-around, receiving the perfect 10 for the Tsukahara vault with the full twist, which was also performed for the first time in Olympic history. She was praised for her feminine beauty and the flamboyant, graceful and intense style. Comaneci won the gold in the all-around, on bars and balance beam. Nellie's weak performance on the beam together with a lower preliminary score, led her to place second in the all-around, after Nadia.

After the 1976 Summer Olympics, Kim moved to Byelorussian SSR (joining the Armed Forces sports society in Minsk) and represented her new club on the USSR team. Two years later Kim successfully competed at the World Championships. She won gold medals on the vault, floor exercise and in the team competition, and placed second in the all-around to Elena Mukhina, overcoming Nadia Comăneci. The greatest success came at the 1979 World Championships, where Kim became the all-around champion, beating Maxi Gnauck, Melita Ruhn and her teammate Maria Filatova. Her floor exercise routine, choreographed by Galina Savarina, was accompanied by a new piece of music, House of the Rising Sun by Santa Esmeralda, which would also be used one year later at the Olympics.

In 1980, Kim won the all-around title at the USSR Championships and successfully competed in the Moscow Olympics, her last competitive performance. She tied for the gold medal on the floor with Nadia Comăneci after scoring 9.95 in that event finals, and won gold in the team competition. As of the 2020 Summer Games in Tokyo, she and Larisa Latynina are the only female gymnasts to defend their Olympic gold medal in the floor exercise event. After the Moscow Olympics, Kim appeared with a roster of other top-class gymnasts at Wembley Arena in January 1981 for a popular exhibition of gymnastic performances on floor and apparatus.

Later life
After her competitive career ended, Nellie Kim worked as a coach and a judge. She coached the South Korean, Italian and Belarus national teams. In 1984, Kim became an International Brevet Judge and judged numerous international competitions, including European Championships, World Championships and Olympic Games. On one occasion, her judging license was suspended by the FIG for a time, after the 1990 World Cup, due to allegations of cheating and fixing scores.  After her suspension ended, she was judging again at the Barcelona Games. Since 1993, she has served as President of the Judging Committee in Artistic Gymnastics of the Republic of Belarus.

Kim's first marriage was to fellow gymnast Vladimir Achasov, but the marriage did not last. She met her second husband, Soviet cyclist Valery Movchan, at the 1980 Olympics, in which he had also won a gold medal. Together they had a daughter (also named Nellie), born in the mid-1980s.

In 1996, Kim was elected to the Women's Artistic Gymnastics Technical Committee of the International Gymnastics Federation (FIG), and moved to the United States soon afterwards. As of 2002, she was residing in Minnesota.

In 1999, Kim was inducted into the International Gymnastics Hall of Fame.

At the FIG Congress of 22 October 2004 in Antalya, Kim was elected President of the Women's Artistic Gymnastics Technical Committee. She helped draft the 2006 changes to the Code of Points, ending the use of the perfect 10 and introducing uncapped scoring for gymnasts. Some of the main causes for the changes were judging scandals at the 2004 Summer Olympics involving Alexei Nemov and other gymnasts. FIG officials, including Kim and Bruno Grandi, believed one of the ways to prevent such scandals in the future, and make clean execution and artistry the main priorities, was a radical overhaul of the old Code.

The move was controversial among fans and athletes alike. Kim and other FIG officials pointed out that the changes were undertaken with the help and advice of FIG member federations and many judges, as had all previous codes. They also highlighted that the system would be tested on major international events before final adoption.

In a 2005 interview, Kim said that unlike her WAG TC President predecessor, Jackie K. Fie, she did not receive any salary from the federation of the country, represented by her in the FIG. And that she works for the FIG on the basis of pure enthusiasm.

In 2013, Kim was accused by Russian coaches of favoring American gymnasts, a view she vehemently refuted and criticized.

Kim was the subject of a half-hour National Film Board of Canada documentary Nelli Kim, co-directed by Georges Dufaux and Pierre Bernier, which was filmed at the 1976 Summer Games and released in 1978.

After the collapse of the Soviet Union, she took Belarusian citizenship.

Eponymous skills
Kim has a total of seven eponymous skills in the Code of Points.

Achievements (non-Olympic)

See also

 List of multiple Olympic gold medalists
 List of top Olympic gymnastics medalists
 List of top medalists at the World Artistic Gymnastics Championships
 List of Olympic female gymnasts for the Soviet Union

References

External links

 Official website (archived 2011)
 
 A signed photo and list of competitive results
 A short biography at Gymnast.ru 
 Online documentary film on Kim at the NFB.ca
 
Montreal 1976 Official Olympic Film - Part 3 | Olympic History - The Olympic Channel

1957 births
Living people
People from Sughd Region
Soviet female artistic gymnasts
Kazakhstani female artistic gymnasts
Gymnasts at the 1976 Summer Olympics
Gymnasts at the 1980 Summer Olympics
Koryo-saram
American people of Tatar descent
Kazakhstani people of Korean descent
Kazakhstani people of Tatar descent
Medalists at the World Artistic Gymnastics Championships
Olympic gold medalists for the Soviet Union
Olympic gymnasts of the Soviet Union
Olympic silver medalists for the Soviet Union
Spartak athletes
World champion gymnasts
Olympic medalists in gymnastics
European champions in gymnastics
Honoured Masters of Sport of the USSR
Recipients of the Order of the Red Banner of Labour
Soviet people of Korean descent
Medalists at the 1980 Summer Olympics
Medalists at the 1976 Summer Olympics
Originators of elements in artistic gymnastics